Chad M. Rienstra is a professor of chemistry at the University of Wisconsin at Madison. He formerly was a tenured professor at the University of Illinois Urbana-Champaign where he joined the Department of Chemistry in 2002 as assistant professor, was promoted to associate professor with tenure in 2008, and was promoted to professor in 2013.

He is a specialist in solid state nuclear magnetic resonance, especially as applied to proteins. His most heavily cited article has been cited 1,754 times according to Google Scholar. Thirty-six of his papers have been cited 36 times or more.

References

University of Illinois Urbana-Champaign faculty
21st-century American chemists
Living people
Year of birth missing (living people)
Place of birth missing (living people)